Chatham Green is a hamlet in the civil parish of Little Waltham and the Chelmsford district of Essex, England. Chatham Green is adjacent to the A131 road, which runs to the A130, combined being the road from Braintree to Chelmsford.

Chatham Green's public house and restaurant is The Windmill.

Within the hamlet are twelve Grade II listed houses and cottages. Chatham was recorded in the Domesday Book of 1086 as Cetham.

References 

 Essex A-Z (page 23)

Hamlets in Essex
City of Chelmsford